The Zeiformes  are a small order of marine ray-finned fishes most notable for the dories, a group of common food fish. The order consists of about 33 species in seven families, mostly deep-sea types.

Zeiform bodies are usually thin and deep. Mouths are large, with distensible jaws, and there is no orbitosphenoid. Pelvic fins have 5–10 soft rays and possibly a spine, 5–10 dorsal fin spines and up to 4 anal fin spines.

The boarfishes (Caproidae) have been included in this order though they are currently included in the Perciformes.

Families
Family Cyttidae (lookdown dories)
Family Grammicolepididae (tinselfishes)
Family Oreosomatidae (oreos)
Family Parazenidae (parazens)
Family Sorbinipercidae (extinct)
Family Zeidae (dories)
Family Zenionidae (zeniontids) (formerly known as Macrurocyttidae)
Family Bajaichthyidae (extinct, Bajaichthys elegans)

Timeline of genera

References 

 
 J.S. Nelson, Fishes of the World
 

 
Ray-finned fish orders
Extant Cenomanian first appearances